The Mangalore City Corporation is the municipal corporation responsible for overseeing the local administration of the Indian city of Mangalore and it's suburbs, which are a major urban area and the most important port city of karnataka state. The mechanism of municipal corporation was introduced in British India, with formation of the municipal corporation in Madras (Chennai) in 1688, followed by municipal corporations in Bombay (Mumbai) and Calcutta (Kolkata) in 1762. It consists of a legislative and an executive body. The legislative body is headed by the Mayor, while the executive body is headed by a Chief Commissioner.

History
The council started its functions with 7 members who were then district officers. Most of them were Europeans.  The Vice-President was the administrative officer. The income of the municipality was about Rs. 15,000.  The population and the area of the town in the year 1866 were about 28,000 and one square mile respectively.  In the year 1871, the population of the town was 29,712; and there were 6,619 houses out of which 4,341 were attached. A dispensary was started for the first time in 1868 at the site of the Lady Goschen Hospital. Subsequently a series of legislations under the Madras Presidency resulted in the gradual empowerment of the local administration and facilitated many welfare activities.

Following the re-organization of States, the Mysore Municipalities Act 1964 came into force as a uniform act throughout the state on 1 April 1965, replacing the Madras District Municipalities Act of 1920.  The provisions of this act gave a new phase to the municipality and it became a city Municipality. Ample opportunities were made in the Act to raise the income and also to carry out some of the obligatory functions.

Mangalore City Corporation (MCC) came into existence during 3 July 1980, which was formerly a Municipality and was expanded during 1996–97 by including Surathkal Town Municipality, Katipalla Notified area, Panamboor, Baikampady, Kulai, Hosabettu villages. Further during April 2002, it was further extended to include Bajal, Kannuru, Kudupu and Thiruvail Panchayath limits into Mangalore City Corporation.

Mangalore City Corporation presided by a mayor.  Mangalore City Corporation currently has a population of more than 600,000 and area of 170 km2 and there is proposal to increase that to 304 km2 by including Mulky in the north and Ullal in the south.  It is divided into 60 wards, each represented by a corporator. Elections to the corporation are held every five years and subsequently a mayor and a deputy mayor are elected for a term of one year. It comes under portion of two Lokasabha Constituencies, four Legislative assembly constituencies and one legislative council constituency.

The city corporation is now housed in its own premises located at M. G. Road, Lalbagh, Mangalore. Since its up-gradation as a city corporation, the civic body has spearheaded several developmental activities in the city and it has been adjudged as one of the best corporations in the state for 3 years continuously.

Mangalore City Corporation (MCC) belongs to Mangalore City South and Mangalore City North constituencies in Karnataka Legislative Assembly and Dakshina Kannada - Lok Sabha constituency.

Functions 
Mangalore City Corporation is created for the following functions:

 Planning for the town including its surroundings which are covered under its Department's Urban Planning Authority .
 Approving construction of new buildings and authorising use of land for various purposes.
 Improvement of the town's economic and Social status.
 Arrangements of water supply towards commercial,residential and industrial purposes.
 Planning for fire contingencies through Fire Service Departments.
 Creation of solid waste management,public health system and sanitary services.
 Working for the development of ecological aspect like development of Urban Forestry and making guidelines for environmental protection.
 Working for the development of weaker sections of the society like mentally and physically handicapped,old age and gender biased people.
 Making efforts for improvement of slums and poverty removal in the town.

Revenue sources 

The following are the Income sources for the Corporation from the Central and State Government.

Revenue from taxes 
Following is the Tax related revenue for the corporation.

 Property tax.
 Profession tax.
 Entertainment tax.
 Grants from Central and State Government like Goods and Services Tax.
 Advertisement tax.

Revenue from non-tax sources 

Following is the Non Tax related revenue for the corporation.

 Water usage charges.
 Fees from Documentation services.
 Rent received from municipal property.
 Funds from municipal bonds.

Revenue from taxes 
Following is the Tax related revenue for the corporation.

 Property tax.
 Profession tax.
 Entertainment tax.
 Grants from Central and State Government like Goods and Services Tax.
 Advertisement tax.

Revenue from non-tax sources 

Following is the Non Tax related revenue for the corporation.

 Water usage charges.
 Fees from Documentation services.
 Rent received from municipal property.
 Funds from municipal bonds.

Corporation Elections 2019

Wards under the MCC 
There are 60 wards administered by the Mangalore City Corporation. They are
 Surathkal (West)
 Surathkal (East)
 Katipalla (East)
 Katipalla-Krishnapura
 Katipalla (North)
 Iddya (East)
 Iddya (West)
 Hosabettu
 Kulai (Suratkal)
 Baikampady
 Panambur
 Panjimogaru
 Kunjathbail (North)
 Marakada
 Kunjathbail (South)
 Bangrakulur
 Derebail (North)
 Kavoor
 Pachanady
 Tiruvail
 Padavu (West)
 Kadri Padavu
 Derebail (East)
 Derebail (South)
 Derebail (West)
 Derebail (South-west)
 Boloor
 Mannagudda
 Kambla
 Kodialbail
 Bejai
 Kadri (North)
 Kadri (South)
 Shivabagh
 Padavu (Central)
 Padavu (East)
 Maroli
 Bendoor
 Falnir
 Court
 Central Market
 Dongerkery
 Kudroli
 Bunder
 Port
 Cantonment
 Milagres
 Kankanady-Valencia
 Kankanady
 Alape (South)
 Alape (North)
 Kannur
 Bajal
 Jeppinamogaru
 Attavar
 Mangaladevi
 Hoige Bazaar
 Bolar
 Jeppu
 Bengre

Notable people 
 

Rajani Duganna, politician and former mayor

References

External links 
 Mangalore City Corporation Website

Municipal corporations in Karnataka
1865 establishments in British India
Government of Mangalore